Blessy Kurien is an actress from Kerala who is well known for her roles in Malayalam-language television serials.

Filmography

Television series

TV Shows as host
 Onuruchimelam Season 1 (Asianet)
 X Factor (Kairali TV)
 Good Life ( Rosebowl)
 Taste Time (Asianet)
 Taste of Kerala (Amrita TV)
 Food to See You (Kappa TV)
 Salt and Pepper (Kaumudy TV) - Celebrity presenter

TV Shows as Participant
 Start Music Season 3 (Asianet)
 Vismayaravu (Zee Keralam)

References

External links
 

Actresses from Kerala
Living people
Actresses in Malayalam television
Actresses in Malayalam cinema
Indian women television presenters
1991 births